Walter Knödel (May 20, 1926 – October 19, 2018) was an Austrian mathematician and computer scientist. He was a computer science professor at the University of Stuttgart.

Born in Vienna, Walter Knödel studied mathematics and physics at the University of Vienna. Also in Vienna, Knödel received his PhD in 1948 for his work on number theory under the direction of Edmund Hlawka and got habilitated in 1953. In 1961, Walter Knödel became professor for mathematics at the University of Stuttgart.

Walter Knödel authored a number of books and scientific publications. He wrote the first German textbook on computer programming in 1961.
He was the founding dean of the faculty for computer science at the University of Stuttgart and founding member of the German Computer Society the Gesellschaft für Informatik.

The Knödel numbers became named after Walter Knödel. He died in Stuttgart on October 19, 2018.

References 

20th-century  Austrian  mathematicians
Academic staff of the University of Stuttgart
1926 births
2018 deaths
University of Vienna alumni
Austrian expatriates in Germany
Scientists from Vienna